Angel Pavement is a British television drama series which first aired on BBC 2 between 19 August and 9 September 1967. It is an adaptation of the 1930 novel Angel Pavement by J. B. Priestley, about a small London firm struggling in the early 1930s until the arrival of the mysterious Mr. Golspie revives the fortunes of the company.

Both this and a previous 1957 BBC adaptation are considered completely lost.

Cast
 Anthony Bate as Mr. Golspie
 Murray Melvin as Turgis
 Cyril Luckham as Mr. Smeeth
 Hilda Braid as Mrs. Smeeth
 Tina Martin as Edna Smeeth
 Tony Steedman as Dersingham
 Judy Parfitt as Lilian Matfield
 Jane Bond as Lena Golspie
 Christopher Cooper as Stanley Poole
 Anna Cropper as Miss Cadnam
 Jean Muir as Poppy Sellers
 Erik Chitty as Benenden
 Jan Conrad as Captain
 Faith Kent as Mrs. Dersingham
 Beryl Cooke as Mrs. Pearson
 John Wentworth as Mr. Pearson
 George A. Cooper as Fred Mitty
 Ann Tirard as Miss Verever
 Rita Merkelis as Dot Mitty
 Norah Blaney as Mrs. Mitty
 Cynthia Etherington as Caretaker
 Rose Howlett as Mrs. Cross
 Desmond Jordan as Norman Birtley
 Stephen Rea as Second Mate
 Paula Topham as Miss Ansdell
 Philip Ray as Major Trape

References

Bibliography
Ellen Baskin. Serials on British Television, 1950-1994. Scolar Press, 1996.

External links
 

BBC television dramas
1967 British television series debuts
1967 British television series endings
English-language television shows
Television shows based on British novels